North Main Street Historic District is a national historic district located at Poplar Bluff, Butler County, Missouri.  It encompasses 19 contributing buildings and 1 contributing structure in a predominantly residential section of Poplar Bluff.  The district developed between about 1880 and 1954, and includes representative examples of Queen Anne, Neo-Classical Revival, Colonial Revival, Late Gothic Revival, and Bungalow / American Craftsman style architecture. Located in the district is the separately listed Moore-Dalton House. Other notable buildings include the Holy Cross Episcopal Church (c. 1902) and the Zion Lutheran Church (c. 1947).

It was added to the National Register of Historic Places in 2011.

References

External links

Historic districts on the National Register of Historic Places in Missouri
Queen Anne architecture in Missouri
Neoclassical architecture in Missouri
Colonial Revival architecture in Missouri
Gothic Revival architecture in Missouri
Bungalow architecture in Missouri
Buildings and structures in Butler County, Missouri
National Register of Historic Places in Butler County, Missouri